{{DISPLAYTITLE:C22H26O4}}
The molecular formula C22H26O4 may refer to:

 AM-1714
 Cannabinolic acid 
 Hexestrol diacetate
 Seratrodast

Molecular formulas